Toen may refer to:
 Taoyuan (disambiguation), a variety of locations in China and Taiwan
 Toen (commune), a commune in Koun Mom District, Cambodia

See also

Thoen (name)